As a member of the EFTA, Liechtenstein (LI) is included in the Nomenclature of Territorial Units for Statistics (NUTS). The three NUTS levels all correspond to the country itself:
 NUTS-1: LI0 Liechtenstein
 NUTS-2: LI00 Liechtenstein
 NUTS-3: LI000 Liechtenstein

Below the NUTS levels, there are two LAU levels (LAU-1: electoral districts; LAU-2: municipalities).

See also
 Subdivisions of Liechtenstein
 Electoral District of Oberland
 Electoral District of Unterland
 ISO 3166-2 codes of Liechtenstein
 FIPS region codes of Liechtenstein

Sources
 Hierarchical list of the Nomenclature of territorial units for statistics - NUTS and the Statistical regions of Europe
 Overview map of EFTA countries - Statistical regions at level 1
 LIECHTENSTEIN - Statistical regions at level 2
 LIECHTENSTEIN - Statistical regions at level 3
 Correspondence between the regional levels and the national administrative units
 Communes of Liechtenstein, Statoids.com

Liechtenstein
Subdivisions of Liechtenstein